William Hughes Mearns (1875–1965), better known as Hughes Mearns, was an American educator and poet.  A graduate of Harvard University and the University of Pennsylvania, Mearns was a professor at the Philadelphia School of Pedagogy from 1905 to 1920.  Mearns is remembered now as the author of the poem "Antigonish" (or "The Little Man Who Wasn't There"). However, his ideas about encouraging the natural creativity of children, particularly those age 3 through 8 were novel at the time.  It has been written about him that, "He typed notes of their conversations; he learned how to make them forget there was an adult around; never asked them questions and never showed surprise no matter what they did or said."

Mearns wrote two influential books: Creative Youth 1925, and Creative Power 1929. Essayist Gabriel Gudding credits those books with "[lighting] a fuse" under the teaching of creative writing, influencing a generation of scholars.

He also served for a time (starting in 1920) as head of the Lincoln School Teachers College at Columbia University.  He was also a proponent of John Dewey's work in progressive education.

Antigonish

Mearns is credited with the well-known rhyme, composed in 1899 as a song for a play he had written, called The Psyco-ed.  The play was performed in 1910, and the poem was first published as "Antigonish" in 1922.
Yesterday upon the stair
I met a man who wasn’t there
He wasn’t there again today
I wish, I wish he’d go away

When I came home last night at three
The man was waiting there for me
But when I looked around the hall
I couldn’t see him there at all!
Go away, go away, don’t you come back any more!
Go away, go away, and please don’t slam the door

Last night I saw upon the stair
A little man who wasn’t there
He wasn’t there again today
Oh, how I wish he’d go away
"Antigonish" (1899)

Mearns also wrote many parodies of this poem, entitled Later Antigonishes, such as "Alibi":
As I was falling down the stair
I met a bump that wasn't there;
It might have put me on the shelf
Except I wasn't there myself.

Other works
 I Ride in My Coach (illustrated by W.T. Schwarz) 1923
 Lions in the Way  1927
 Richard Richard (illustrated by Ralph L. Boyer) 1916
 Vinegar Saint (illustrated by Ralph L. Boyer) 1919
 Night Goblins (illustrated by Ralph L. Boyer) 1923

References

External links

 
 
 

Harvard University alumni
University of Pennsylvania alumni
American educators
20th-century American poets
1875 births
1965 deaths